The Michell Cup is a cup awarded annually at Cambridge University to the College boat club who has got the most points over the academic year.  It was instituted in 1923 in the memory of Robert Williams Michell

 1923 King's
 ...
 1927 Selwyn/Peterhouse (tied)
 1928 Peterhouse
 1929 Peterhouse
 ...
 1931 Magdalene 
 1932 St Catherine's
 ...
 1934 Jesus
 ...
 1937 Corpus Christi
 ...
 1939 King's
 ...
 1946 Trinity Hall
...
 1956 Peterhouse
 ...
 1973 Sidney Sussex
 ...
 2005 Pembroke
 2006 1st & 3rd
 2007 Jesus
 2008 1st & 3rd
 2009 Magdalene
 2010 Newnham
 2011 Newnham 
 2012 St Catharine's
 2013 Hughes Hall
 2014 St Catharine's
 2015 1st & 3rd
 2016 Hughes Hall/Lucy Cavendish
 2017 Caius
 2018 Wolfson

References 

Sport at the University of Cambridge
1923 establishments in England
Rowing in England